Grčec is a village in the municipality of Saraj, North Macedonia.

Demographics
The 1981 Yugoslav census recorded 1,315 inhabitants of which 1,207 were Albanians, 49 Turks, 35 Macedonians and 24 others. The 1994 Macedonian census recorded 1,805 inhabitants of which 1,768 were Albanians, 5 Turks, 30 Macedonians and 2 others. According to the 2021 census, the village had 36 inhabitants.
Albanians 3
Others 33

References

External links

Villages in Saraj Municipality
Albanian communities in North Macedonia